The western woolly lemur or western avahi (Avahi occidentalis) is a species of woolly lemur native to western Madagascar, where they live in dry deciduous forests. These nocturnal animals weigh . It is a folivorous species.

The western woolly lemurs live in monogamous pairs together with their offspring.

Ecology
The Western woolly lemur mostly consumes leaves and buds that derive from around 20 different plants which have not matured and have high levels of sugars and proteins. The food is typically consumed within the time frame of two hours before dawn and two hours after dusk, in which the lemurs consume their food at the tops of trees ranging between 2 and 9 metres. During feeding time, lemurs typically settle on thinner branches unless the tree itself is too small to support the animal's weight. Most likely due to the lemur's folivorous diet, Western woolly lemurs spend large amounts of time resting in order to conserve energy.

Behavior
Western woolly lemurs travel in pairs with their mate and offspring. These pairs are female-dominated and usually very peaceful. However, if conflicts do arise, they are always initiated and resolved by the female. The female Western woolly lemur also is known for not showing submission towards a male partner.

Conservation
Because the Avahi as a species is highly selective in their folivorous diet, depending on plants with specific characteristics, it is hard to keep Avahi in captivity. Therefore, one of the primary and most general ways of conserving the species is to conserve the forests in which Avahi are currently found.

Description
The species is located northeast of Bombetoka Bay, in northwestern Madagascar. Its facial fur is white, white-grey, or cream, and forms an outline that contrasts with its surrounding facial features. There is a small darker spot of fur above the nose within the facial outline, and the light facial hair extends below the ears. The eyes have a yellow-brown tint and are surrounded by a circle of black, hairless skin. The nose is black and hairless, and the hair surrounding the nose has a white tint. Its head and body is a brown-grey or yellowish-brown color, and the fur is lightly curled and may appear freckled (some may have a darker color along the back). The tail is pale gray or has tints of greyish-beige, but can also have tints of red, and occasionally, some will have a white tip. On the chest, belly, and inner parts of the body, the fur is fairly thin, light beige, cream, or of an apricot color.

References

External links

ARKive - images and movies of the western woolly lemur (Avahi occidentalis)

Woolly lemurs
Mammals described in 1898
Taxa named by Ludwig Lorenz von Liburnau